Rebecca Serle is an American author and television writer. Her novel In Five Years was a New York Times best seller, and her Famous in Love series was adapted into a young adult television series on Freeform.

Personal life 
Serle received a Master of Fine Arts degree from The New School.

She grew up in Maui and currently has residences in New York City and Los Angeles.

Selected works

One Italian Summer (2022) 
One Italian Summer is expected to be published March 1, 2022 by Atria Books. The book was named one of "Goodreads Members' Most Anticipated Books of 2022."

It has received a positive review from Kirkus.

In Five Years (2020) 
In Five Years was published March 10, 2020 by Atria Books. 

Before publication, In Five Years was named one of the most anticipated books of 2020 by Good Housekeeping and She Reads.

After publication, the book was a New York Times and IndieBound best seller and was a book club selection for Good Morning America and Marie Claire. The New York Times named the audiobook edition of their "New & Noteworthy Audiobooks" in March 2020.

It received positive reviews from Kirkus, Seattle Book Review, Booklist, Library Journal, and Publishers Weekly.

In Five Years was nominated for a Goodreads Choice Award for Romance.

Famous in Love series (2014-2015) 
The Famous in Love series consists of two books: Famous in Love (2014) and Truly, Madly, Famously (2015).

Famous in Love received positive reviews from Kirkus and Publishers Weekly. The sequel received a positive review from Booklist.

TV adaptation 

Freeform adapted the series into a young adult television series by the same name. The series ran for two seasons from April 18, 2017 to June 29, 2018.

Publications

Standalone novels 

 One Italian Summer (2022)
 In Five Years (2020)

 The Dinner List (2018)
 The Edge of Falling (2014)
 When You Were Mine (2012)

Famous in Love series 
 Famous in Love (2014)
 Truly, Madly, Famously (2015)

References

External links 
 

Writers from Los Angeles
Writers from New York City
Living people
Year of birth missing (living people)
The New School alumni
People from Maui